In term logic, a genus is one of the predicables; it is that part of a definition which is also predicable of other things different from the definiendum. E.g., figure in the definition: A triangle is a rectilinear figure. In fixing the genus of a thing, we subsume it under a higher universal, of which it is a species.

See also 

 The Five Predicables
 Differentia
 Genus–differentia definition

Scholasticism
Definition